Tarni Stepto is an Australian female softball Olympian. She was born in Sydney, NSW, Australia in 1999.

Early life 
Stepto was born into a sports-crazed family. She started playing softball when very young. Her sister was a pitcher so she decided to try pitching as well and was very good at it,

She made her junior national team debut as a teenager and was selected to her first NSW team in 2015. In 2017 she was crowned the Most Valuable Player at the U17 National Championships. She was also selected as the Best Pitcher and Best Player of the Grand Final awards.

In 2018, in her first year in the Australian senior side, she participated in the Pacific Cup. She was then selected in the Championship squad.

Stepto’s inspiration was her fellow Kamilaroi woman and Tokyo 2020 teammate Stacey Porter.

Achievements 
In order to experience the American collegiate softball game, Stepto enrolled at the Oregon State University. In her first year she was made the Scenic West Athletic Conference Pitcher of the Year.

Stepto was selected for the Australian women's national softball team at the 2020 Summer Olympics. The team came away with one win out of five, beating Italy 1-0 in their second match of the Round Robin and finished fifth overall. Stepto pitched against the United States.

References 

1999 births
Living people
Australian softball players
Softball players at the 2020 Summer Olympics
Olympic softball players of Australia